Bahadur Singh Lama Tamang is a building contractor, Nepali politician and currently serving as member of the Bagmati Provincial Assembly. He is also leader of the Opposition in the Bagmati Provincial Assembly from Nepali Congress. He had previously served as the member of the House of Representatives of the federal parliament of Nepal, elected through the proportional representation system from Nepali Congress and member of the Development Committee of the House of Representatives.

References

Living people
Nepali Congress politicians from Bagmati Province
Nepal MPs 2017–2022
Members of the 2nd Nepalese Constituent Assembly
Tamang people
1970 births